Las Guabas is a corregimiento in Los Santos District, Los Santos Province, Panama with a population of 677 as of 2010. Its population as of 1990 was 1,539; its population as of 2000 was 693.

References

Corregimientos of Los Santos Province